The men's freestyle welterweight competition at the 1964 Summer Olympics in Tokyo took place from 11 to 14 October at the Komazawa Gymnasium. Nations were limited to one competitor.

Competition format

This freestyle wrestling competition continued to use the "bad points" elimination system introduced at the 1928 Summer Olympics for Greco-Roman and at the 1932 Summer Olympics for freestyle wrestling, as adjusted at the 1960 Summer Olympics. Each bout awarded 4 points. If the victory was by fall, the winner received 0 and the loser 4. If the victory was by decision, the winner received 1 and the loser 3. If the bout was tied, each wrestler received 2 points. A wrestler who accumulated 6 or more points was eliminated. Rounds continued until there were 3 or fewer uneliminated wrestlers. If only 1 wrestler remained, he received the gold medal. If 2 wrestlers remained, point totals were ignored and they faced each other for gold and silver (if they had already wrestled each other, that result was used). If 3 wrestlers remained, point totals were ignored and a round-robin was held among those 3 to determine medals (with previous head-to-head results, if any, counting for this round-robin).

Results

Round 1

Tribble and Barlie withdrew after their bouts.

 Bouts

 Points

Round 2

Four men were eliminated after a second loss, and a fifth eliminated after a tie and loss by fall. Sagaradze and Oberlander led the group with 0 points after the second round.

 Bouts

 Points

Round 3

Five more wrestlers were eliminated, each with two losses. Sagaradze received his first point, but now led alone at 1 after Oberlander lost by decision and received 3 points.

 Bouts

 Points

Round 4

Over half of the remaining wrestlers were eliminated, as all 5 losers and 1 of the winners accumulated at least 6 points. Oğan moved up into a tie for the lead with Sagaradze at 2 points; Sanatkaran followed closely at 3 while Dermendzhiev moved to the brink of elimination at 5 points.

 Bouts

 Points

Round 5

Dermendzhiev was the only wrestler eliminated in round 5, leaving 3 remaining wrestlers. 

 Bouts

 Points

Final round

The round 5 draw between Sagaradze and Oğan counted for the final round. Sanatkaran wrestled both of the other medalists to a tie in the final rounds as well. This left all 3 wrestlers in a three-way tie on final round points at 6 because each had drawn the others. The next tie-breaker was total bad points throughout the tournament. Sanatkaran received the bronze medal, having the highest point total at 8 to the other two men's 6. Oğan prevailed on Sagaradze on the next tie-breaker, body weight, with the lighter Turk winning over the heavier Soviet.

 Bouts

 Points

References

Wrestling at the 1964 Summer Olympics